The 2022 Leagues Cup Showcase was a friendly edition of the Leagues Cup, an annual soccer competition between clubs from Major League Soccer and Liga MX in North America. The event featured five matches between MLS and Liga MX sides, played in August and September 2022. It served as a one-time replacement of the previously-planned 2022 Leagues Cup, which was not held due to fixture congestion from the 2022 FIFA World Cup and other factors.

Background
The third edition of the Leagues Cup was initially planned for 2022, with Allegiant Stadium in Paradise, Nevada chosen as the host for the final. However, on April 14, 2022, MLS and Liga MX announced announced that the 2022 tournament would not be held due to fixture congestion from the 2022 FIFA World Cup and other factors, and instead would be replaced by a series of friendly matches, known as the Leagues Cup Showcase. According to Major League Soccer, it was intended to "serve as a preview" for the expanded tournament in 2023. As part of the announcement, it was confirmed that the Leagues Cup Showcase would be held on August 3, 2022, at SoFi Stadium in Inglewood, California. The event featured a doubleheader of matches: LA Galaxy against Guadalajara and Los Angeles FC against América. On June 30, 2022, it was announced that the Leagues Cup Showcase would expand to include three more matches—FC Cincinnati against Guadalajara at TQL Stadium in Cincinnati, Ohio; Nashville SC against América at Geodis Park in Nashville, Tennessee, on September 21; and Real Salt Lake against Atlas at America First Field in Sandy, Utah, on September 22.

Teams
The following eight teams (from two associations) participated in the event.

Venues

Matches

References

External links

2022
2022 in American soccer
2022–23 in Mexican football
August 2022 sports events in the United States
September 2022 sports events in the United States